Ward Islands is an island group  in the Australian state of  South Australia located in the Investigator Group about  west by south of Cape Finniss on the west coast of Eyre Peninsula.  The group was discovered and named by Matthew Flinders on 13 February 1802.  The island group has enjoyed protected area status since the 1960s and since 2011, it been part of the Investigator Group Wilderness Protection Area.

Description

The group consist of two islands: Ward Island (also known as the NE islet) and South Ward Island (also known as the SE Islet).

Access to Ward Island (and presumably to South Ward Island) is reported as being ‘complicated by the swell and the rocky coast’ to the extent that in one instance, ‘no safe boat landing sites could be found’.  As a result, a survey carried out in 1980 used a helicopter to land survey personnel on Ward Island.

Formation, geology and oceanography
The Ward Islands were formed about 9450 years ago following the rise of sea levels at the start of the Holocene. 
 
Geologically, Ward Island is the remnant of a small hill with a volcanic plug core which had solidified to granite more than 1500 Ma ago and whose summit was buried under sand that consolidated to calcarenite, and that has been extensively eroded by wave action since the commencement of sea level rise.

Flora and fauna

Flora
Terrestrial flora on the island group was found in 1980 to be represented by 12 species present as a ‘low, salt and wind-pruned heath’ and dominated by the following three species.  Marsh saltbush is common on Ward Island in ‘deepest patches of the sandy loam soil’ followed by Nitre bush which favours ‘limey calcareous soils’ and pointed twinleaf which favours ‘the orange, decomposed sandstone soils’.  South Ward Island is vegetated with marsh saltbush as are a number of large rocks which are permanently exposed above low water.

Fauna
Vertebrate animals observed on the island group include Australian sea lions and New Zealand fur seals and the following bird species:  short tailed shearwater, white faced storm petrel, osprey, white-bellied sea-eagle, Richard’s pipit, sooty oystercatcher, silver gull, Pacific gull and rock parrot.

History

European discovery and use
Flinders discovered the island group on Saturday, 13 February 1802, and reportedly named it after his mother’s maiden name.  On the same day, Flinders also nominated it as one of the constituent parts of the Investigator Group.

Protected areas status

The Ward Islands first received protected area status as part of a fauna reserve declared under the Fauna Conservation Act 1964 either on 1 September 1966 or 16 March 1967.  The island group and other adjoining islands became part of the Investigator Group Conservation Park proclaimed under the National Parks and Wildlife Act 1972 in 1972.  On 25 August 2011, it was one of the island groups excised from the Investigator Group Conservation Park and added to the Investigator Group Wilderness Protection Area.  Since 2012, the waters adjoining the Ward Islands have been part of a habitat protection zone in the Investigator Marine Park.

See also
List of islands of Australia
Investigator Islands Important Bird Area

Citations and references

Citations

References
	

Islands of South Australia
Uninhabited islands of Australia
Great Australian Bight